Hoplite is an iOS and Android video game developed by Australian indie developer Douglas Cowley and released on December 20, 2013. Its artwork includes old-school pixel art done by Shroomarts.

Reception
The game has a Metacritic rating of 88% based on 6 critic reviews. Touch Arcade said "It's very simple to learn, but there's a huge amount of depth to the game. " PocketGamerUK said "An incredible, ever-changing blend of dungeon-crawling and tactical puzzles, Hoplite may lack a little longevity but it's impressively entertaining while it lasts." D+Pad Magazine wrote "Ultimately Hoplite is not a game based to any great extent about discovering new content or unlocking secrets; while some abilities are added to the roster for completing achievements, it does not have the complexity of hidden mechanics that its close comparator 868-HACK does. Instead it is, bluntly, the more “accessible” game and perhaps as a result the truer evocation of retro gaming. Its rules can be learned very quickly, as any good short-playing game should, and yet it still has elements of deep strategy, choice and randomisation to provide a motivation for chasing high scores." Gameblog.fr wrote "Hoplite is a procedural tactical game that will require patience, concentration and planning. The ideal indie game to chain-die in the bus, the subway or on the beach." GradItMagazine said "Hoplite proudly flies its roguelike colours. Permadeath, turn-based combat and punishing difficulty await those game enough to plunder the dungeons’ depths in search of the Golden Fleece. The punishing, and often frustrating, difficulty of Hoplite is balanced by short, quick levels and an addictiveness that only comes from a desire to not let the game get the best of you." Multiplayer.it wrote "Hoplite is the perfect example of how you can create a roguelike in a bunch of days and get the job done."

References

2013 video games
Android (operating system) games
IOS games
Turn-based strategy video games
Video games set in antiquity
Video games based on Greek mythology
Video games developed in Australia